Lac Marville is a lagoon in the Kerguelen islands, part of the French Southern and Antarctic Lands.
 

Location
Lac Marville is located on Grande-Terre, the archipelago's main island, along the northeastern shore of the Courbet Peninsula, between Cape Sandwich to the south and Cape Digby to the north.

It was patently known to whalers as early as the 19th century, for Captain Joseph J. Fuller in his memoirs described a large lake, at the back of the Royal Bay, the circumference of which was about 15 miles. However, no mention of the lake appeared on charts until the 1930s.

Toponymy
This great lake was first officially mentioned by Edgar Aubert de la Rüe when he reported on his expeditions to Kerguelen in 1928-1929 and 1931. He chose the name of Marville without publishing the reasons.

Hydrology

Lac Marville is about as long  as it is wide ; it thus differs from most of the great lakes of the Kerguelen which have an elongated shape, constrained by the steep-sided morphology of the valleys.

Seven islets dot the lake. The largest hardly exceeds .

Even before the lake was mapped, navigators (especially those of the Challenger expedition  in 1874), had pointed out at the northern entrance of the outlet a remarkable green hillock, the "Morne Vert".

Lac Marville is mainly fed by the Rivière de l'Est which originates at the foot of Mont Courbet and Delta Peak in the western mountains of the Courbet peninsula. Many waterflows complete this contribution, descending from the Azorella's hills or from the Hautes Mares to the north and from Mount Peeper to the south.

A short outlet flows into the ocean across the coastline along the back beach towards the south.

Freshwater contains  of dissolved salts with a high proportion of chlorides due to marine influence.

Ecology
Like the whole of the eastern plain of the Courbet peninsula, many peat bogs occupy the edges of the lake.

No native fish live in the lakes and rivers of the Kerguelen. At the end of the 1950s, salmonids were deliberately introduced in the archipelago. Brown trout (Salmo trutta), in particular those released into the Rivière du Château, colonized the entire drainage system of the peninsula thanks to their marine migratory form. Their arrival in Lac Marville occurred between 1982 and 1992.

A green freshwater algae species belonging to the genus Pediastrum, (Pediastrum marvillense), was first described in Lac Marville.

Geology
The formation of the lake seems linked to the closure of a former marine gulf.

The bottom is made up of fine quaternary deposits, clayey-sandy, of fluvio-glacial origin.

References

Landforms of the Kerguelen Islands
Marville